Solja is a surname. Notable people with the surname include:

Amelie Solja (born 1990), Austrian table tennis player
Petrissa Solja (born 1994), German table tennis player